R. Don Cook is the organ area coordinator and the university carillonneur at Brigham Young University (BYU).

Cook has bachelor's and master's degrees in organ from BYU.  He has a DMA from the University of Kansas.  Prior to joining the BYU faculty he was an organist at Christ Church, Cranbrook in Bloomfield Hills, Michigan and at First United Methodist Church in Lubbock, Texas.

Cook developed the Organ Tutor: Organ 101 program, a multi-media program that has been used to teach organ in multiple countries.  His course plans were also used as the basis for a program began in 2003 at the University of Utah.

Cook has been a member of the BYU faculty since 1991.  He has directed the BYU Organ Workshop since its founding in 2002.

Besides being the official player of the Bell Tower at BYU, Cook was also involved with selecting the bell used in the old Brigham Young Academy building when it was refurbished into the Provo City Library at Academy Square.  His playing of the Bell Tower at BYU has been featured as part of Provo's Freedom Festival.  Many of the works Cook plays on the BYU carillon are his own compositions.

Cook and his wife Kim live in Spanish Fork, Utah.  They are the parents of six children.

Sources 
 Salt Lake City American Guild of Organist bio of Cook
 BYU bio
 Church News March 14, 2009 article about Cook's organ endeavors
 Mormon Times 22 March, 2010 article about Cook's efforts to teach organ on a broad scale
 BYU Magazine Spring 2009 article about Cook's playing the bells at BYU
 June 28, 2007 Deseret News article about BYU's carrillon
 USA Today Dec. 13, 2004

Year of birth missing (living people)
Living people
21st-century organists
21st-century American keyboardists
American male organists
Brigham Young University alumni
Brigham Young University faculty
Carillonneurs
People from Spanish Fork, Utah
University of Kansas alumni
American organists